Qerrekhlu (also Romanized as Qerrekhlū; also known as Qeretlī and Qerrekhlī) is a village in Abarj Rural District, Dorudzan District, Marvdasht County, Fars Province, Iran. At the 2006 census, its population was 544, in 120 families.

References 

Populated places in Marvdasht County